Barab (also Romanized as Barāb) is a village in Bakhtajerd Rural District, in the Central District of Darab County, Fars Province, Iran. At the 2006 census, its population was 733, in 177 families.

References 

Populated places in Darab County